Kallar may refer to:

Places

India
 Kallar, Kanhangad near Kanhangad, Kerala, India
 Kallar, Trivandrum in Trivandrum district in Kerala, India
 Kallar River, a tributary of the Neyyar river in India, flowing through Tamil Nadu and Kerala
 Kallar River (Pamba), a tributary of the Pamba river in India, flowing through Kerala

Iran
 Kallar-e Olya, a village in Chaharmahal and Bakhtiari Province, Iran
 Kallar-e Sofla, a village in Chaharmahal and Bakhtiari Province, Iran

Other uses
 Kallar (caste), a caste in Tamil Nadu

See also

 Kalar (disambiguation)
Kalla (disambiguation)